Cyclophora megista is a moth in the family Geometridae. It is found in Guatemala.

References

Moths described in 1892
Cyclophora (moth)
Moths of Central America